Please Smile My Noise Bleed is an album by the Icelandic group múm. It was released on the Morr Music label in 2001.

Track listing
 "On the Old Mountain Radio" – 5:11
 "Please Sing My Spring Reverb" – 5:20
 "Please Sing My Spring Reverb" (Styromix by Styrofoam) – 5:33
 "Please Sing My Spring Reverb" (Caetena mix by I.S.A.N.) – 4:17
 "Flow Not So Fast Old Mountain Radio" – 1:28
 "Please Sing My Spring Reverb" (Phonem mix) – 6:39
 "On the Old Mountain Radio" (Christian Kleine mix) – 6:16
 "Please Sing My Spring Reverb" (AMX mix by Arovane) – 5:39
 "Please Sing My Spring Reverb" (B. Fleischmann mix) – 5:24

2001 albums
Múm albums
Morr Music albums